Salvatore John Campisi (born August 11, 1942) is an American former professional baseball player. A right-handed pitcher, he appeared in Major League Baseball for the St. Louis Cardinals in 1969 and 1970 and the Minnesota Twins in 1971. The ,  Campisi, a Brooklyn native, attended Long Island University Brooklyn before signing with the Cardinals in 1964.

Campisi put up three consecutive stellar seasons at the Double-A and Triple-A levels of minor league baseball from 1967 to 1969, with a gaudy won–lost record of 36–8 (.818) in 124 games pitched, 100 of them in relief. His overall minor-league record was 58–21 (.734). He worked in 50 MLB games, all as a relief pitcher, and allowed 62 hits and 47 bases on balls in 63 innings pitched. He had four saves — all for the 1970 Cardinals.

References

External links
, or Retrosheet
Pura Pelota (Venezuelan Winter League)

1942 births
Living people
Arkansas Travelers players
Cardenales de Lara players
Cedar Rapids Cardinals players
Florida Instructional League Cardinals players
Lafayette High School (New York City) alumni
LIU Brooklyn Blackbirds baseball players
Long Island University alumni
Major League Baseball pitchers
Minnesota Twins players
Navegantes del Magallanes players
American expatriate baseball players in Venezuela
Portland Beavers players
Raleigh Cardinals players
Rock Hill Cardinals players
Sarasota Cardinals players
Sportspeople from Brooklyn
Baseball players from New York City
St. Louis Cardinals players
Tulsa Oilers (baseball) players